Spa water may refer to:
Spring (hydrosphere)
Bottled mineral water from the springs of a day spa or destination spa
Water in a whirlpool bath
 Spa (mineral water), a brand of mineral water from Spa, Belgium
 Infused water, flavored with fruits or vegetables